Arthur "Art" Tsuneo Wakabayashi,  (born May 12, 1932) is a Canadian civil servant.

Born in Regina, Saskatchewan, Wakabayashi was a provincial deputy finance minister, assistant deputy minister to the federal solicitor general, and federal economic development minister. He was Chancellor of the University of Regina.

Honours

In 2000, he was made a Member of the Order of Canada in recognition for being a "devoted career public servant". In 2012, he was awarded the Order of the Rising Sun, 3rd Class, Gold Rays with Neck Ribbon. In 2013, he was made a Member of the Saskatchewan Order of Merit.

References

External links
 Encyclopedia of Saskatchewan entry

1932 births
Living people
20th-century Canadian civil servants
Canadian people of Japanese descent
Members of the Order of Canada
Members of the Saskatchewan Order of Merit
People from Regina, Saskatchewan
Recipients of the Order of the Rising Sun, 3rd class
University of Regina